Fredrik Bekken (born 11 March 1975) is a Norwegian representative rower and Olympic medalist.

He won a silver medal in double scull at the 2000 Summer Olympics in Sydney, rowing with Olaf Tufte.

He won a bronze medal in the double sculls at the 1999 World Rowing Championships, also with Olaf Tufte.

References

1975 births
Living people
Norwegian male rowers
Rowers at the 1996 Summer Olympics
Rowers at the 2000 Summer Olympics
Olympic rowers of Norway
Olympic silver medalists for Norway
Olympic medalists in rowing
Medalists at the 2000 Summer Olympics
World Rowing Championships medalists for Norway